The International Conference on Logic for Programming, Artificial Intelligence and Reasoning (LPAR) is an academic conference aiming at discussing cutting-edge results in the fields of automated reasoning, computational logic, programming languages and their applications.

It grew out of the Russian Conferences on Logic Programming 1990 and 1991; the idea to organize the conference was largely due to Robert Kowalski who proposed to create the Russian Association for Logic Programming. The conference was renamed in 1992 to "Logic Programming and Automated Reasoning" (LPAR) to reflect its extended scope, due to considerable interest in automated reasoning in the Former Soviet Union. After a break from 1995 to 1998, LPAR continued in 1999 under the name "Logic for Programming and Automated Reasoning", to indicate an extension of its logic part beyond logic programming. In 2001, the name changed to "Logic for Programming, Artificial Intelligence and Reasoning".

The LPAR steering committee consists of Matthias Baaz, Chris Fermüller, Geoff Sutcliffe, and Andrei Voronkov (chair).

Overview of conference events

References

External links 
  — accounting for 1st to 15th conference (1990–1994, 1999–2008)
 17th LPAR's home page (2010)
 18th LPAR's home page (2012)
 19th LPAR's home page (2013)
 LPAR page at DBLP

Theoretical computer science conferences
Logic conferences